The 1.5 μm process is the level of MOSFET semiconductor process technology that was reached around 19811982, by leading semiconductor companies such as Intel and IBM.

Products featuring 1.5 μm manufacturing process
 NEC's 64kbit SRAM memory chip introduced the 1.5 μm process in 1981.
 Intel 80286 CPU launched in 1982 was manufactured using this process.
 Intel introduced a 64kbit DRAM memory chip using a 1.5 μm CMOS process in 1983.
 Ricoh RF5C164 is a  silicon-gate CMOS sound chip used in the Sega CD video game console, released in 1991.
 The Amiga Advanced Graphics Architecture (initially sold in 1992) included chips such as Lisa that were manufactured using a 1.5 μm CMOS process.
 Intel used the 1.5-micron process on the HMOS-III techology.
 Intel used the 1.4-micron process on the HMOS II-E technology.
 Intel used the 1.5-micron process on the CHMOS III technology.

References

External links
Brief timeline of microprocessor development

01500
1982 introductions